Alejandro Daniel Siri Pérez (born December 17, 1963) is a male former field hockey player from Argentina. He competed for his native country at two consecutive Summer Olympics, starting in 1988. Siri won a gold medal at the 1991 Pan American Games and a silver medal at the 1987 Pan American Games.

References

External links
 

1963 births
Living people
Argentine male field hockey players
Field hockey players at the 1988 Summer Olympics
Field hockey players at the 1992 Summer Olympics
Olympic field hockey players of Argentina
Pan American Games gold medalists for Argentina
Pan American Games silver medalists for Argentina
Pan American Games medalists in field hockey
Field hockey players at the 1987 Pan American Games
Field hockey players at the 1991 Pan American Games
1990 Men's Hockey World Cup players
Medalists at the 1987 Pan American Games
Medalists at the 1991 Pan American Games
20th-century Argentine people